Edward T. Young (October 27, 1858 – September 19, 1940) was an American lawyer and politician.

Young was born in Henderson, Minnesota. He received his law degree from University of Minnesota and was admitted to the Minnesota bar in 1881. Young practiced law in Appleton, Minnesota and served as the Appleton City Attorney. He also served on the Appleton City Council and was a Republican. Young served in the Minnesota House of Representatives in 1889 and 1890 and in 1893 and 1894. Young also served in the Minnesota Senate from 1895 to 1902. Young served as the Minnesota Attorney General from 1905 to 1909.

References

1858 births
1940 deaths
People from Appleton, Minnesota
People from Henderson, Minnesota
University of Minnesota Law School alumni
Minnesota lawyers
Minnesota city council members
Minnesota Attorneys General
Republican Party Minnesota state senators
Republican Party members of the Minnesota House of Representatives